The Cheater Reformed is a 1921 American silent drama film directed by Scott R. Dunlap and starring William Russell, Seena Owen and  Sam De Grasse.

Cast
 William Russell as Jordan McCall / Dr. Luther McCall
 Seena Owen as Carol McCall
 Jack Brammall as Buster Dorsey
 Sam De Grasse as Thomas Edinburgh
 Ruth King as Mrs. Edinburgh

References

Bibliography
 Munden, Kenneth White. The American Film Institute Catalog of Motion Pictures Produced in the United States, Part 1. University of California Press, 1997.

External links
 

1920s American films
1921 films
1921 drama films
1920s English-language films
American silent feature films
American drama films
American black-and-white films
Films directed by Scott R. Dunlap
Fox Film films